The Against Chess Olympiad ( al-Awlambayād aḍ-ḍādi ash-Shatranji) was arranged as an alternative to the official 22nd Chess Olympiad, held in Haifa, Israel, almost simultaneously. This unofficial Olympiad took place in Tripoli, Libyan Arab Republic from October 24 to November 15, 1976.

Background

When FIDE decided to award the hosting of the 1976 Olympiad to Israel, it caused considerable controversy, as several countries, including the Soviet Union and all of the Arab nations, did not recognize the state of Israel. After FIDE refused to change the venue, the Soviet team boycotted the tournament in Haifa in protest, as did all the Soviet satellite states in the Eastern Bloc, and the Arab member nations of FIDE.

The Arab nations held their own Olympiad in Tripoli at the same time as the official one. In the promotion material, this event was called the Against Israel Olympiad, but it has later become known by the politically less volatile name Against Chess Olympiad. This implies that the tournament was against chess itself, which is not correct; the intended meaning was Chess Anti-Olympiad (analogous to antipope).

While the unofficial Tripoli Olympiad was a highly charged political event, the actual chess played was on quite a different level. None of the major chess nations, Eastern or Western, came to Libya, meaning the field consisted of the Arab states, a number of minor chess nations, and some that were not members of FIDE at the time. No Grandmasters were present, and very few International Masters attended.

The Philippines, Italy, and Uruguay were the only nations to send teams to both Olympiads, and none of them won any medals at either event.

Results

Thirty-four teams played a 13-round Swiss system tournament. In a somewhat surprising outcome, the completely unknown Salvadoran team, which included 17-year-old talent Boris Pineda, took home the gold medals. Silver and bronze went to Tunisia and Pakistan, respectively.

See also

 22nd Chess Olympiad (Haifa 1976)

References

Against Chess Olympiad: Tripoli 1976 OlimpBase

Chess Olympiads
1976 in chess
Chess in Libya
1976 in Libyan sport
20th century in Tripoli, Libya
International sports competitions hosted by Libya
Politics and sports